Ortharbela is a genus of moths in the family Cossidae.

Species
 Ortharbela albivenata (Hampson, 1910)
 Ortharbela bisinuata (Hampson, 1920)
 Ortharbela castanea Gaede, 1929
 Ortharbela cliftoni Lehmann, 2009
 Ortharbela diagonalis (Hampson, 1910)
 Ortharbela guttata Aurivillius, 1910
 Ortharbela jurateae Lehmann, 2009
 Ortharbela minima (Hampson, 1920)
 Ortharbela obliquifascia (Hampson, 1910)
 Ortharbela rufula (Hampson, 1910)
 Ortharbela semifasciata Gaede, 1929
 Ortharbela sommerlattei Lehmann, 2008
 Ortharbela tetrasticta (Hampson, 1910)

References

 , 2008: Ten new species of Metarbelidae (Lepidoptera: Cossoidea) from the coastal forests and the Eastern Arc Mountains Of Kenya and Tanzania, including one species From Two Upland Forests. Journal of East African Natural History 97 (1): 43-82. DOI: 10.2982/0012-8317(2008)97[43:TNSOML]2.0.CO;2. Abstract: .
 , 2008: Six New Species of Metarbelidae (Lepidoptera: Cossoidea) from the Eastern Arc Mountains of Tanzania, Including One New Species from Marenji Forest in Southeast Coastal Kenya. Journal of East African Natural History 97 (2): 187-206. DOI: 10.2982/0012-8317-97.2.187. Abstract: .

External links
Natural History Museum Lepidoptera generic names catalog

Metarbelinae